Dio Permana (born 7 June 1995) is an Indonesian professional footballer who played as a midfielder.

Career

Persema Malang
Dio joined Indonesia Premier League club Persema Malang, who were trained by Slave Radovski at the time, as a 17-year-old. Persema provided a long-term contract for Dio. In 2012, he had a trial at Dutch club SC Heerenveen.

International career
In 2012, Dio became the youngest player in the Indonesia U-22 squad for the 2013 AFC U-22 Championship qualification. In 2013, he and three other players were called to Indonesia U-19 for the 2014 AFC U-19 Championship qualification. Indonesia U-19 qualified for the 2014 AFC U-19 Championship after winning Group G.

References

External links
Dio Permana

1995 births
Living people
Sportspeople from Malang
Indonesian footballers
Association football midfielders
Persema Malang players
Arema F.C. players
Persela Lamongan players